Top Latin Albums is a record chart published by Billboard magazine and is labeled as the most important music chart for Spanish language, full-length albums in the American music market. Like all Billboard album charts, the chart is based on sales. Nielsen SoundScan compiles the sales data from merchants representing more than 90 percent of the U.S. music retail market. The sample includes sales at music stores, the music departments of electronics and department stores, direct-to-consumer transactions, and Internet sales of physical albums or digital downloads. A limited array of verifiable sales from concert venues is also tabulated. To rank on this chart, an album must have 51% or more of its content recorded in Spanish. Before this chart, all Latin music information was featured on the Latin Pop Albums chart, which began on June 29, 1985, and is still running along with the Regional Mexican Albums and Tropical Albums chart.

On the week ending February 11, 2017, Billboard updated the methodology to compile the Top Latin Albums chart into a multi-metric methodology to include track equivalent album units and streaming equivalent albums units.

The table that follows is accurate as of the issue dated August 5, 2017. A total of 253 albums achieved a number-one debut on the chart.

Number-one debuts

Summaries

Artists with most number-one debuts

See also 

 List of number-one Billboard Top Latin Albums from the 1990s
 List of number-one Billboard Top Latin Albums of 2000
 List of number-one Billboard Top Latin Albums of 2001
 List of number-one Billboard Top Latin Albums of 2002
 List of number-one Billboard Top Latin Albums of 2003
 List of number-one Billboard Top Latin Albums of 2004
 List of number-one Billboard Top Latin Albums of 2005
 List of number-one Billboard Top Latin Albums of 2006
 List of number-one Billboard Top Latin Albums of 2007
 List of number-one Billboard Top Latin Albums of 2008
 List of number-one Billboard Top Latin Albums of 2009
 List of number-one Billboard Latin Albums from the 2010s
 List of number-one Billboard Latin Albums from the 2020s

References 

1990s in Latin music
2000s in Latin music
2010s in Latin music